Davina and Jasmine Kumari-Baker were murdered by their mother who stabbed them to death at their home in Stretham, Cambridgeshire, England, while they slept on 13 June 2007. Rekha Kumari-Baker was sentenced to life imprisonment with a minimum tariff of 33 years. In 2010 the BBC stated that the punishment was "one of the longest jail terms given to a woman in the UK in modern times."

The older daughter Davina, aged 16, was killed first, with Kumari-Baker stabbing her 39 times. The younger daughter Jasmine, aged 13, was found dead in her bed stabbed 29 times.

The prosecutor stated that Rekha Kumari-Baker killed the girls as a form of revenge against her ex-husband and father of the girls, David Baker. The murderer had purchased kitchen knives from ASDA, the murder weapons, on 11 June.

Council review
Cambridgeshire County Council conducted a review into the murders and found they could not have been prevented and listed recommendations for social workers in relation to the review.

See also
Louise Porton – fellow British female double killer who murdered her two daughters in 2018

Cases of filicide attributed to revenge against an ex-spouse:
 John Battaglia
 Elaine Campione
 Amy Hebert
 Charles Mihayo
 Aaron Schaffhausen

References

2007 in England
2007 murders in the United Kingdom
2009 in England
2000s in Cambridgeshire
Deaths by person in England
Deaths by stabbing in England
Female murder victims
Filicides in England
History of Cambridgeshire
Incidents of violence against girls
June 2007 events in the United Kingdom
Murder in Cambridgeshire
Sisters